Pitcairnia halophila is a plant species in the genus Pitcairnia. This species is native to Costa Rica.

References

halophila
Flora of Costa Rica